Wendy Braga (born 25 April 1983) is a Mexican actress, dancer, model and television host.

Biography
She was born in Mérida, Yucatan. At four years old she studied ballet, and later dancing professionally for the National Company of Cuba in Mérida. At age 18, she opened a dance school where she teaches sporadically. In 1999, she began her career as a presenter of the television program Efecto joven on Channel 13 in the city of Mérida. In 2002, she presented the program Carnaval Superior Mérida 2002 of TV Azteca Mérida and in 2003 she hosted Aquí en el 2. In 2003, she obtained a degree in Communication Sciences and, in 2005 the specialty in Film, Radio, Television and Journalism, both degrees awarded by the Universidad Anahuac. In 2009, she was chosen to be the face of Yucatán in the Bicentennial, as part of a campaign by TV Azteca to promote tourist attractions and natural in Mexico.

Filmography

References

External links

Wendy Braga IMDB.com

1981 births
Living people
Actresses from Yucatán (state)
People from Mérida, Yucatán
21st-century Mexican actresses
Mexican female models
Mexican television presenters
Mexican women television presenters